The 2014 Kremlin  Cup was a tennis tournament played on indoor hard courts. It was the 25th edition of the Kremlin Cup for the men (19th edition for the women) and part of the ATP World Tour 250 Series of the 2014 ATP World Tour, and of the Premier Series of the 2014 WTA Tour. It was held at the Olympic Stadium in Moscow, Russia, from 13 October through 19 October 2014.

Points and prize money

Point distribution

Prize money

ATP singles main-draw entrants

Seeds

 Rankings are as of October 6, 2014

Other entrants
The following players received wildcards into the singles main draw:
  Evgeny Donskoy
  Karen Khachanov
  Andrey Rublev

The following players received entry from the qualifying draw:
  Victor Baluda
  Ričardas Berankis
  Aslan Karatsev
  Peđa Krstin

Withdrawals
Before the tournament
  Pablo Cuevas → replaced by  Malek Jaziri
  Richard Gasquet → replaced by  Pere Riba
  Máximo González → replaced by  Juan Mónaco
  Denis Istomin → replaced by  Daniel Gimeno Traver
  Dmitry Tursunov → replaced by  Andrey Kuznetsov

ATP doubles main-draw entrants

Seeds

1 Rankings are as of October 6, 2014

Other entrants
The following pairs received wildcards into the doubles main draw:
  Evgeny Donskoy /  Andrey Rublev
  Konstantin Kravchuk /  Andrey Kuznetsov

WTA singles main-draw entrants

Seeds

 Rankings are as of October 6, 2014

Other entrants
The following players received wildcards into the singles main draw:
  Darya Kasatkina
  Aleksandra Krunić

The following players received entry from the qualifying draw:
  Vitalia Diatchenko
  Kateryna Kozlova
  Kateřina Siniaková
  Lesia Tsurenko

Withdrawals
Before the tournament
  Sara Errani (bronchitis) → replaced by  Ana Konjuh
  Ana Ivanovic (hip injury) → replaced by  Irina-Camelia Begu
  Jelena Janković (back injury) → replaced by  Kristina Mladenovic
  Bojana Jovanovski → replaced by  Tsvetana Pironkova
  Angelique Kerber → replaced by  Donna Vekić
  Petra Kvitová → replaced by  Ajla Tomljanović
  Magdaléna Rybáriková (left hip strain) → replaced by  Olga Govortsova
  Carla Suárez Navarro (right elbow injury) → replaced by  Elena Vesnina
  Caroline Wozniacki → replaced by  Danka Kovinić

Retirements
  Olga Govortsova (left knee injury)
  Klára Koukalová (viral illness)

WTA doubles main-draw entrants

Seeds

1 Rankings are as of October 6, 2014

Other entrants
The following pair received a wildcard into the doubles main draw:
  Veronika Kudermetova /  Evgeniya Rodina

Champions

Men's singles

  Marin Čilić def.  Roberto Bautista Agut, 6–4, 6–4

Women's singles

  Anastasia Pavlyuchenkova def.  Irina-Camelia Begu, 6–4, 5–7, 6–1

Men's doubles

  František Čermák /  Jiří Veselý def.  Sam Groth /  Chris Guccione, 7–6(7–2), 7–5

Women's doubles

  Martina Hingis /  Flavia Pennetta def.  Caroline Garcia /  Arantxa Parra Santonja, 6–3, 7–5

References

External links
 

Kremlin Cup
Kremlin Cup
Kremlin Cup
Kremlin Cup
Kremlin Cup
Kremlin Cup